Ishasha Airport  is an airport serving Ishasha, a town in  the North Kivu Province of Democratic Republic of the Congo.

The runway has a  grass strip clear of structures, opening into a further  open field, however it has trees and shrubbery growing in it.

The town of Ishasha is on the Ishasha River, locally the border with Uganda.

See also

Transport in the Democratic Republic of the Congo
List of airports in the Democratic Republic of the Congo

References

External links
FallingRain - Ishasha Airport

OpenStreetMap - Ishasha

Airports in North Kivu